Sarmeydan (also Romanized as Sarmeydān) is a village in Vardasht Rural District, in the Central District of Semirom County, Isfahan Province, Iran. At the 2006 census, its population was 49, in 9 families.

References 

Populated places in Semirom County